Aristotle George "Harry" Agganis (April 20, 1929 – June 27, 1955), nicknamed "The Golden Greek", was an American college football player and professional baseball player. After passing up a potential professional football career, he played in Major League Baseball as a first baseman from 1954 to 1955 for the Boston Red Sox.

Born in Lynn, Massachusetts, to Greek immigrants Georgios Agganis and Georgia Papalimperis, Agganis first gained notice as a college football player at Boston University, becoming its first student named All-American. He passed up a professional career with the Cleveland Browns in order to play his favorite sport, baseball, close to his hometown. He signed a bonus baby contract, and after one season playing minor league baseball, he started at first base for the Red Sox.

In 1955, Agganis became gravely ill early in the season and was hospitalized for two weeks for pneumonia. He rejoined the Red Sox for a single week before being rehospitalized with a viral infection. After showing some signs of recovery, he died of a pulmonary embolism on June 27.

Early life
Aristotle George Agganis was born in Lynn, Massachusetts, United States, growing up with four brothers and two sisters. His family was from Longanikos, Sparta, Greece. He was a star football and baseball player at Lynn Classical High School as well as a strong student, named "All-Scholastic".

College career 
Agganis enrolled at Boston University, where he became a starter, primarily at quarterback. After his sophomore season in 1949, when he set a school record by tossing fifteen touchdown passes, he entered the Marine Corps. Agganis played for the Camp Lejeune (N.C.) football and baseball teams. He received a dependency discharge from the Marines to support his mother and returned to college to play in 1951–52. Around the same time, Agganis was participating in summer baseball leagues in Augusta, Maine.

Agganis became the school's first All-American in football and Boston coach Buff Donelli named Agganis the "greatest football player he ever coached". He also played basketball and baseball in the school.

Coach Paul Brown of the Cleveland Browns thought he could be the successor to Otto Graham and drafted the college junior in the first round of the 1952 NFL Draft, offering him a bonus of $25,000. Boston Red Sox owner Tom Yawkey outbid Brown, however, and signed Agganis to play Major League Baseball for the Red Sox as a first baseman for $35,000. At the time of his death, Agganis was spending his off-season at his alma mater as an assistant coach, tutoring Tom Gastall, another quarterback who decided to play professional baseball and died young.

Baseball career 
Following his 1953 college graduation, Agganis played with Triple-A Louisville where he hit .281 with 23 home runs and 108 RBI. He made his major league debut on April 13, 1954. Agganis had a modest rookie campaign, although he did lead American League first basemen in assists and fielding percentage. He hit 11 home runs that year, with 57 RBI and a .251 batting average.

Death

In 1955, Agganis briefly lost his starting position to rookie Norm Zauchin. On June 2, he was hospitalized with pneumonia, severe fever and chest pains. He rejoined the Red Sox ten days later and played two games against the Chicago White Sox, before falling ill again in Kansas City, Missouri, on June 5. He was diagnosed with a viral infection and flown back to Sancta Maria Hospital in Cambridge, Massachusetts, where a doctor partially blamed his playing too soon after the first illness. The Red Sox placed him on the voluntary retired list until he recuperated, an early version of the disabled list. He began showing signs of improvement, before a fatal pulmonary embolism on June 27.

Red Sox general manager Joe Cronin told the Associated Press that everyone related to the Red Sox organization was "grieved and shocked", calling Agganis "a grand boy", and saying the team would wear #6 black armbands to honor him. American League president Will Harridge said his office was "saddened and shocked", and Red Sox owner Tom Yawkey said he was "stunned", calling Agganis "a man of great character".  Ten thousand mourners saw his body lie in state at St. George's Greek Orthodox Church in Lynn.

Legacy
Agganis was inducted into the College Football Hall of Fame in 1974. Gaffney Street, near the former site of Braves Field in Boston, was renamed Harry Agganis Way in 1995.

Agganis Arena is a multipurpose sports facility at Boston University. The Harry Agganis Stadium located on Camp Lejeune was named in his honor.

The Agganis Foundation has awarded more than $1.1 million in college scholarships to 780 student-athletes from Boston and the North Shore, including Lynn. Scholarships are awarded for academic and athletic achievement. The Foundation was started in 1955 by the Boston Red Sox and owner Thomas A. Yawkey, the (Lynn) Daily Item newspaper and Harold O. Zimman, a mentor of Agganis for whom the football field at Tufts University is named.

See also
Boston University athletics
List of baseball players who died during their careers

References

External links
 
 

1929 births
1955 deaths
American football quarterbacks
Major League Baseball first basemen
Boston Red Sox players
Boston University Terriers baseball players
Boston University Terriers football players
College Football Hall of Fame inductees
Sportspeople from Lynn, Massachusetts
Baseball players from Boston
Players of American football from Boston
American people of Greek descent
Infectious disease deaths in Massachusetts
Deaths from pneumonia in Massachusetts
Deaths from pulmonary embolism
United States Marines